Get Your Body Beat is an EP by the aggrotech band Combichrist. It is considered to be the band's break-out single. The video for the song shows scenes of Combichrist playing as well as scenes from The Gene Generation movie. The intro from the ambient track "DNA AM" can also be heard at the start of the video.

The single track appeared on Billboards Top 10 Dance Singles chart and peaked at #1 on the German Alternative Chart (DAC), ranking #16 on the DAC Top Singles of 2006.

Track listing

References

Combichrist albums
2006 EPs